Leslie John "Les" Wilson (born 10 July 1947) is a football administrator and former professional player. He played in The Football League for Bristol City, Norwich City, and most notably Wolverhampton Wanderers, one of the first North American-trained players to do so. Following his playing career with the original North American Soccer League's and his hometown Vancouver Whitecaps, Wilson became a Canadian Soccer Association coach and administrator involved in some of the national program's finest ever results. He is an honoured member of the Canada Soccer Hall of Fame.

Childhood and youth career
His family settled in Vancouver, Canada, when Wilson was seven years old. He played youth soccer for Collingwood Legion in the Vancouver and District Juvenile Soccer League.

Playing career
Les Wilson was just 16 years old when he made his Pacific Coast League debut on September 15, 1963, for the Westminster Royals FC. He scored three goals in that 1963-64 rookie season and won the Ed Bayley Trophy as BC Soccer's most outstanding player in his first year in senior soccer. He was also selected to play for the Vancouver All-Stars in a June 10 exhibition match against touring Liverpool FC.

Wilson was invited England to try out for Wolverhampton Wanderers. He made his Wolves first team debut in December 1965, in a Second Division away match against Middlesbrough.

Wilson is one of very few professional footballers to have played in matches in nine different positions, as designated in that era by a player's jersey number, something he achieved while playing for Wolves. During his over ten years playing in England, which also included a brief stint at both Bristol City and Norwich City, Wilson played over 100 First Division matches.

Coaching and administrative career
Wilson became a Whitecaps coach immediately following retiring as a player, helping the club lift the 1979 NASL Soccer Bowl, and stayed on with the club as an administrative until the organization folded in 1984.

Wilson joined Canada Soccer as a national teams administrator. During his tenure, the senior national team reached their only World Cup finals, Mexico 1986. The side also reached the quarter-finals at the 1984 Summer Olympics and beat huge odds to win the 2000 CONCACAF Gold Cup championship with Wilson on staff.

Wilson was named CONCACAF assistant secretary in 1999. The following year he became executive director of the British Columbia Soccer Association.

References

External links

Canada Soccer Hall of Fame
Canada Soccer Records & Results

1947 births
Living people
Association football utility players
Bristol City F.C. players
Canadian soccer players
Canada Soccer Hall of Fame inductees
English emigrants to Canada

Kansas City Spurs players
Los Angeles Wolves players
Naturalized citizens of Canada
North American Soccer League (1968–1984) players
North American Soccer League (1968–1984) indoor players
Norwich City F.C. players
Footballers from Manchester
Soccer players from Vancouver
United Soccer Association players
Vancouver Whitecaps (1974–1984) players
Wolverhampton Wanderers F.C. players
Association football midfielders
Canadian expatriate soccer players
Canadian expatriate sportspeople in England